The pale-legged leaf warbler (Phylloscopus tenellipes) is a species of Old World warbler in the family Phylloscopidae. The species was first described by Robert Swinhoe in 1860. It is found in Manchuria; it winters in Southeast Asia. Its natural habitat is temperate forests.

Description
It is 12 cm in length with brownish upperparts and a contrasting greyish-brown crown and nape. The whitish supercilium contrasts strongly, not reaching the forehead but extending well behind the eyes. Its eyeline is dark brown and wider behind the eye. Cheeks mottled pale brown and throat whitish. White undertail coverts contrast with paler olive-brown rump and uppertail coverts, lacks greenish tinge. Breast and belly whitish, washed pale brown.

Voice
Song, tiriririririririri repeating.

References

pale-legged leaf warbler
Birds of Manchuria
pale-legged leaf warbler
Taxonomy articles created by Polbot